Graylyn Estate, or Graylin, is a historic estate located in Winston-Salem, Forsyth County, North Carolina. It was listed on the National Register of Historic Places in 1978. The construction of the Norman Revival style mansion began in 1928. Associated with the house are a number of contributing outbuildings including a garage-guest house and "farm" complex. Today, Graylyn estate is used as a conference center and hotel. It is currently a member of Historic Hotels of America, the official program of the National Trust for Historic Preservation.

It is on a  estate.

History

Construction 

In 1925, spouses Nathalie Lyons Gray and Bowman Gray Sr., chairman of the R. J. Reynolds Tobacco Company, purchased the 87 acre estate from R. J. Reynolds with the plan of building “the home of their dreams.” The land had formerly been corn fields and pasture for the Reynolda Estate, which is now referred to as the Reynolda Historic District. The Grays then employed artisans and craftsmen from all over the United States to build what was one of the largest private homes in North Carolina.

The groundbreaking for the mansion took place on January 15, 1928, and as many as 136 people worked on the construction of the estate at one time. The mansion was built in the style of Norman architecture and contained approximately 60 rooms. At the time, it was second to George Vanderbilt's Biltmore Estate in Asheville, North Carolina, as the largest private home in the state.

The ironwork throughout the property was designed by Joseph Barton Benson, an ironsmith from Philadelphia. Nathalie Gray personally decorated the rooms of Graylyn, and the grounds and gardens were designed by Thomas Warren Sears. The amenities of the house were considered very lavish at the time, and its original telephone system and floodlight system "were at the cutting end of technology for the 1930s."

Later Uses 
Nathalie Gray and her sons gifted the estate to the Bowman Gray School of Medicine of in 1946. The estate was used as a psychiatric hospital from 1947 to 1959. Gordon Gray, the son of Nathalie and Bowman Gray, bought the estate back in 1972 and donated it to Wake Forest University. In the following years, the estate was used for multiple purposes including university programs and community service. From 1977 to 1980, Graylyn was used as a dormitory and housed approximately 40 students a year.

Fire and reconstruction 
On June 20, 1980, a fire started in the house during a performance on the lawn by the Winston-Salem Symphony. Nearly 7,000 people watched as the fire extensively damaged the interior of the house. The following day, James R. Scales, the president of Wake Forest University at the time, announced that Graylyn would be rebuilt and restored to its 1932 appearance. The restoration of the mansion and Bernard Cottage was completed in 1984 at a cost of $6,000,000.

Current usage 
Graylyn is currently used as a conference center and contains 85 guest rooms and fifteen meeting rooms. Graylyn has five separate buildings for guest accommodations, including the Manor House, the Mews, Bernard Cottage, Gardener's Cottage and the Bungalows.

References

External Links

Houses on the National Register of Historic Places in North Carolina
Romanesque Revival architecture in North Carolina
Houses in Winston-Salem, North Carolina
National Register of Historic Places in Winston-Salem, North Carolina
Historic hotels in the United States
Hotels in North Carolina
Historic Hotels of America